Shetlerville is an unincorporated community in Hardin County, Illinois, United States. Shetlerville is west of Rosiclare.

References

Unincorporated communities in Hardin County, Illinois
Unincorporated communities in Illinois